YRL may refer to

 Red Lake Airport, a Canadian airport to the south of Ontario, with the IATA airport code YRL

 the Nheengatu language, spoken in Brazil, with language code YRL